The following is a timeline of the history of the city of Dushanbe, Tajikistan.

20th century

 1923 - Town of Dushanbe established in the Emirate of Bukhara.
 1925 - Town becomes capital of the Tajik Autonomous Soviet Socialist Republic.
 1929
 Town renamed "Stalinabad." 
 Railroad begins operating.
 1934 - Tajikistan National Museum established.
 1935 - Ura-tepe-Stalinabad road opens.
 1946 - Pamir Stadium opens.
 1950 - CSKA Pomir Dushanbe football club formed.
 1951 - Academy of Sciences of Tajik SSR established.
 1955 - Trolleybuses begin operating.
 1960 - Zoo opens.
 1961 - City named "Dushanbe" again.
 1964 - Dushanbe Airport in operation.
 1965 - Population: 312,000.
 1975 - Palace of Unity and Hotel Tajikistan built.
 1979 - Population: 510,000.
 1981 - Saodat Teahouse built.
 1984 - Goskino Cinema and Concert Hall built.
 1985 - Population: 552,000 (estimate).
 1987 - Sister city relationship active with Boulder, Colorado, USA.
 1990

 12–14 February: Dushanbe riots.
 Gurminj Museum of Musical Instruments established.
 1992 - Demonstrations against government.
 1996
 Mahmadsaid Ubaydulloyev becomes mayor.
 Dynamo Dushanbe football club formed.
 Russian-Tajik Slavonic University established.
 1997 - Presidential Palace stormed.

21st century

 2002 - Curfew lifted.
 2003
 Academy of Maqâm founded.
 2003 Central Asian Games held.
 2005 - January: Car explosion.
 2007
 14 November: Bombing at Palace of Unity.
 Istiqlol Dushanbe football club formed.
 Population: 670,168.
 2009 - New Dushanbe Synagogue opens.
 2011 - Dushanbe Flagpole erected.
 2012 - 5 September: Fire in Karvon market, and subsequent protest.
 2017 - Population: 823,787 (estimate).

See also
 Dushanbe history (ru, uk)
 Other names of Dushanbe
 History of Tajikistan

References

This article incorporates information from the Russian Wikipedia and the Ukrainian Wikipedia.

Bibliography

External links

 Timeline
Dushanbe
Tajikistan history-related lists
Dushanbe